William Allison (August 1, 1930 – April 25, 2016) was a former casino owner and actor. Allison had appeared in many cameo roles, such as Ocean's Eleven as an old guard, but his acting experience started when he was hired as a consultant for the production of Martin Scorsese's 1995 film, Casino, due to his casino experiences. In Casino, Allison played the Latter-day Saint (Mormon) Bagman, John Nance, who was based on Jay Vandermark.

Filmography

References

External links

American male film actors
American businesspeople
1930 births
2016 deaths